Växjö Lakers Hockey Club (often referred to as the Växjö Lakers or VLH) is a Swedish ice hockey club from Växjö in Sweden. The club play at the Vida Arena and plays in the Swedish Hockey League (SHL; formerly Elitserien), the top-level league of Swedish ice hockey, and made its debut there in 2011–12. Since entering the SHL the club has become known as one of the premier clubs winning the Le Mat Trophy as Swedish national Champions three times in 2015, 2018 and 2021 (the most of any SHL clubs since their promotion). forwards Erik Josefsson, and Robert Rosén, are the only players to be part of all 3 Championship teams.

History
The club was founded in 1997, after Växjö HC went bankrupt that year. Växjö Lakers originally played in Växjö Ishall as their home arena, but prior to the 2011–12 season they moved to Vida Arena. The construction of the Vida Arena was finished in summer 2011.

The club began play in the 1997–98 season. Starting in Division 4, four divisions below the Elitserien/SHL, Växjö worked its way to HockeyAllsvenskan within 6 years, being promoted 3 times. With a perfect record in the 2003 HockeyAllsvenskan Kvalserien, the club qualified for HockeyAllsvenskan. Sensationally, during their debut season in HockeyAllsvenskan, the club acquired Shjon Podein, an NHL-merited North American player who played 699 NHL games and won the Stanley Cup with the Colorado Avalanche in 2001. The acquirement was described as "årets värvning" (acquirement of the year) by some people. During Podein's years in Växjö he became a crowd favorite. Prior to the following season, the 2004–05 season, the team also acquired Brad DeFauw, another NHL-merited North American player who played 9 NHL games and 154 AHL games. Both Shjon Podein and Brad DeFauw left the team after the 2004–05 season.

The club would spend 8 seasons in HockeyAllsvenskan and, during that time, reach the Kvalserien qualification for Elitserien three times. Växjö did not manage to promote to Elitserien in the 2009 and 2010 respective Kvalserien qualifications, but after winning the 2010–11 HockeyAllsvenskan season for the first time in club history and earning a third consecutive trip to Kvalserien, Växjö secured promotion to the top-tier league Elitserien in the eighth round (of ten) in the 2011 Kvalserien. The team finished the 2011 Kvalserien with 26 points, which is a record in the Kvalserien history.

The team formerly used red, yellow and blue as its colours, both in the team's logo and the team's jerseys. On 18 April 2011 it was announced that the club had changed the colours of their jerseys to blue and orange prior to the 2011–12 season. At that time it was also announced that the club's logo had been changed to an orange shield containing the name of the club beneath a lion holding a crossbow – an image from the Småland coat of arms.

Elitserien/Swedish Hockey League

The club's first game in the Elitserien league was played on 13 September 2011, losing 0–2 to Frölunda HC in front of an outsold Scandinavium. Two days later, the club historically took their first points in Elitserien, beating Luleå HF on away ice 3–2 in a shootout, despite trailing by two goals in the third period. Their first home game was played on September 17, against Linköpings HC, in front of an outsold Vida Arena. Linköping won the game 4–2. Former Växjö Lakers crowd favorite Shjon Podein watched the game in the arena. Their first home points and regulation-time win came on September 27, when the Lakers won 4–1 against Modo Hockey. The Lakers' first shutout came on away ice when Modo were beaten 2–0 on 25 October 2011.

Växjö Lakers played the first Småland derby game in Elitserien history, which was on away ice against reigning regular-season champions HV71, on 8 October 2011 in front of an outsold Kinnarps Arena—exactly 7,000 spectators—in Jönköping. Växjö Lakers came out on top with a 3–2 victory in a shootout. Växjö Lakers forward Mike Iggulden scored three penalty shot goals in the game, two of them counted in the statistics.

Season-by-season record

Players and personnel

Current roster

Updated 4 March 2023

Team captains

 Mikael Bjerdahl, 2003–04
 Torsten Yngvesson, 2004–07
 Johan Markusson, 2008–14
 Tomi Kallio, 2014–15
 Liam Reddox, 2015–19
 Erik Josefsson, 2019–Present

Honored members

Franchise records and leaders

Scoring leaders
These are the top-ten point-scorers of the Växjö Lakers since their promotion to the SHL in the 2011–12 season. Figures are updated after each completed season.

Note: Pos = Position; GP = Games played; G = Goals; A = Assists; Pts = Points; P/G = Points per game;  = current Växjö Lakers player

Trophies and awards

Team
Le Mat Trophy
 2014–15, 2017–18, 2020–21

Individual
Coach of the Year
 Sam Hallam: 2017–18
Honken Trophy
 Viktor Fasth: 2017–18
Rookie of the Year
 Elias Pettersson: 2017–18

References

External links

Official website
Lakers Lakejer official website

 
Swedish Hockey League teams
Ice hockey teams in Sweden
Sport in Växjö
Ice hockey clubs established in 1997
1997 establishments in Sweden
Ice hockey teams in Kronoberg County